The Moscow Towers is a skyscraper under construction located on plot 15 in the Moscow International Business Center in  Moscow, Russia. It will be 283.4 meters tall and will have 62 floors with 400,000 m2 of floor area.

Gallery

External links

 

Skyscrapers in Russia
Buildings and structures under construction in Russia